Lynne Susan Cullens (born 1964) is a British Anglican bishop serving as the Bishop of Barking, a suffragan bishop in the Diocese of Chelmsford.

Cullens served as rector of Stockport and Brinnington in the Church of England's Diocese of Chester from 2019 until her consecration. She was consecrated a bishop by Justin Welby, Archbishop of Canterbury, on 25 January 2022 at St Paul's Cathedral.

References

1964 births
Living people
21st-century English Anglican priests
Bishops of Barking